Jacques Ravel is an American microbiologist and professor, currently serving as Director at the Institute for Genome Sciences and Professor of Microbiology and Immunology at the University of Maryland School of Medicine. His academic work focuses on the dynamic between microbiome and women's health, and has included research on the role of the vaginal microbiome in protecting against infections, currently explored through LUCA Biologics as part of Seed. Ravel is currently director of the Collaborative Research Center on Sexually Transmitted Diseases, exploring the 'connection between human genetic variation, sexually transmitted infections, and the functions of the vaginal microbiome', and is part of the White House's Human Microbiome Project.

Academic work 
Ravel's work focuses on the relationship between the human microbiome and the 'relatively neglected' vaginal microbiome. In 2015, he was awarded the Blaise Pascal International Research Chair, to research at the Institut Pasteur in Paris. His studies have primarily focused on the vagina and have included 'determining the microbial changes that may result in a common and difficult-to-control infection called bacterial vaginosis, which afflicts more than 20 million American women of childbearing age', as well as sexual diseases and others. During the COVID-19 pandemic, his research lab at the University of Maryland monitored the spread of variants using 'vital genome sequencing'.

In an interview with in 2022, he noted “There’s a major lack of innovation [in women’s health],”, and announced his research would form the basis of LUCA Biologics, a US-based biotech spinoff of Seed Inc. that The New York Times notes as developing 'probiotics for B.V. and preterm birth'. Insider noted the start-up aimed to target UTIs with microbiome.

References 

Living people
Year of birth missing (living people)
American microbiologists